Steven Mehrdad Beitashour (born February 1, 1987) is a professional soccer player who currently plays as a right-back for Colorado Rapids. Born in the United States, he represented the Iran national team.

Background
Steven Beitashour was born to Edward and Pari Beitashour in San Jose, California. He has an older brother, Tony, and two sisters, Tina and Stephanie. His parents are both from Iran and moved to the United States in the 1960s. His father, an electrical engineer, played soccer for San Francisco State University before working for Apple. Beitashour is of Assyrian Christian descent from his father's side and Shia Muslim Persian descent from his mother's side, enjoying support from both communities in the United States. He has Iranian-American dual citizenship, and is married to his wife named Karlie. The couple announced the birth of their son Brayden on February 1, 2019, and their son Zayne in May 2022.

Club career

College and amateur

Beitashour graduated from Leland High School in 2005 where his number 3 jersey was later retired, becoming only the second Leland athlete after Pat Tillman to have a jersey retired. Steven was the captain of his high school's varsity team and was their leading goalscorer his junior and senior years in the number 10 role. He was a four-year letter-winner and was a two-time offensive player of the year before being a divisional first-team selection. In his graduating year at Leland, Beitashour received the inaugural Pat Tillman Award, given to a Bay Area student for outstanding achievements in both athletics and academics.

He went on to play four years of college soccer at San Diego State University after receiving a scholarship, redshirting his freshman season. He majored in communication with a minor in biology at San Diego State University, choosing it over several schools including San Jose State University, University of California, Santa Cruz and Notre Dame de Namur University. Coach Lev Kirshner moved Beitashour to the right-back position in order to utilize his quick speed and one-on-one defending abilities. In his senior year at State, Steven earned an all-Pac-10 honorable mention. During his late college years, Beitashour also played for the San Jose Frogs in the Premier Development League. He graduated from San Diego State in December 2009.

Professional

San Jose Earthquakes

Beitashour was drafted in the second round (30th overall) of the 2010 MLS SuperDraft by the San Jose Earthquakes, the local team that he supported as a young ball boy, becoming the second Iranian (after Khodadad Azizi) to play for the Earthquakes. He made his professional debut on April 10, 2010 in a 2–1 win against the Chicago Fire, and scored his first professional goal on April 24, 2010 against Chivas USA. Beitashour was selected for the 2012 MLS All-Star Game and played the full 90 minutes against Chelsea in the 3–2 win. The Earthquakes won the 2012 MLS Supporters' Shield with Beitashour starting in all 33 of his regular season appearances and leading the league with 110 crosses that season. Following the Supporters' Shield title, Beitashour featured for the Earthquakes in the 2013–14 CONCACAF Champions League. He provided 16 assists in his last 3 years with the Earthquakes, more than any other MLS defender during the same time period.

Vancouver Whitecaps FC

The Vancouver Whitecaps FC acquired Beitashour for an undisclosed amount on January 27, 2014. On March 8, Beitashour played his first match for the Whitecaps in their season opener against the New York Red Bulls, providing a secondary assist to Kenny Miller in their 4–1 win. Beitashour was named in the MLS team of the week after his performance against the LA Galaxy on April 19. On April 26, he provided a game-tying assist to Sebastián Fernández in the last minute of the match against Real Salt Lake. Beitashour was nominated for the 2014 MLS All-Star Game against Bayern Munich. On September 27, he provided a game-winning assist to Pedro Morales in a 2–1 win against Real Salt Lake. On October 10, the Whitecaps won the 2014 Cascadia Cup with a 1–0 win at the Seattle Sounders. The Whitecaps also qualified for the 2015–16 CONCACAF Champions League as the best Canadian team of the regular season.

Prior to the start of the 2015 MLS season, Beitashour was the Whitecaps' players union representative. On March 14, 2015 in the second game of the Whitecaps' 2015 season, Beitashour provided an assist to Octavio Rivero during the 86th minute in a 1–0 win over the Chicago Fire. On July 29, 2015, Beitashour and his Whitecaps teammates attended a charity event for children in Nanaimo. On August 26, 2015, the Whitecaps won the 2015 Canadian Championship to qualify for the 2016–17 CONCACAF Champions League.

Toronto FC
Beitashour was traded to Toronto FC during the 2015–16 off-season for TFC's second round selection in the 2016 MLS SuperDraft. He made his debut for Toronto FC in a 2–0 win over the New York Red Bulls on March 6, 2016. On November 30, 2016, Beitashour provided an assist to Benoît Cheyrou to clinch the Eastern Conference title during the 2016 MLS Cup Playoffs. On October 22, 2017, Toronto FC won the Supporters' Shield, breaking the MLS record for the most points in a single season. On December 9, 2017, Beitashour won the 2017 MLS Cup with Toronto FC for the first time in the club's history, becoming the first MLS team to complete a domestic treble.

Los Angeles FC
In January 2018, Beitashour signed with Los Angeles FC for their inaugural season. He provided two assists in their second match before providing another one in their following match to Carlos Vela in the first El Tráfico derby. He scored his first goal for LAFC on May 5, 2018 against FC Dallas. He scored his second goal for the club on June 9, 2018 against his hometown club, the San Jose Earthquakes. In October 2018, LAFC unveiled a Persian language T-shirt in honor of Beitashour. In September 2019, Beitashour and LAFC won the club's first major trophy with the Supporters' Shield.

Colorado Rapids
On September 19, 2020, Beitashour signed a one-year deal with Colorado Rapids as a free agent. In December 2020, Beitashour signed a one-year contract extension with the Rapids ahead of the 2021 Major League Soccer season. He made his club debut on July 21, 2021 in a league match against FC Dallas. Beitashour re-signed with the Rapids on January 7, 2022 for the 2022 Major League Soccer season. On November 10, 2022, his contract option was declined by Colorado. On December 13, 2022, the Colorado Rapids re-signed Beitashour for the 2023 Major League Soccer season.

International career

Eligibility

Since Beitashour has Iranian Citizenship through Jus sanguinis principles, he is eligible to play for Iran. Beitashour was born in the United States and is an American citizen; he thus had the choice of either playing for Iran or the United States.

When asked about his choice in a 2012 interview, he stated: 

Iran national team coach Carlos Queiroz began to recruit eligible players from the Iranian diaspora to reinforce the squad. In June 2012, it was reported that Queiroz was interested in inviting Beitashour.

United States 

Beitashour was called up for an international friendly by the United States national football team against Mexico on August 15, 2012; however, he was an unused substitute.

Coach Jürgen Klinsmann later explained about his "surprise callup":

Iran 

On October 5, 2013, Beitashour was called up to the Iran national football team by Carlos Queiroz to be part of the preliminary 27-man squad for a 2015 AFC Asian Cup qualification match against Thailand. It was initially unclear whether Beitashour would accept the invitation. Two days later, it was confirmed that Beitashour had accepted the call-up and would join the squad in time for the match on October 15. He made his debut in Iran's 2–1 win over Thailand, coming on as a sub for Mahini in the 76th minute. His first assist came to striker Ghoochannejhad against Thailand in the away leg on November 15, helping to seal their place in the 2015 AFC Asian Cup. On June 1, 2014, Beitashour was named to Iran's 2014 FIFA World Cup squad. He was an unused substitute in all three matches and was not called into Iran's squad for the 2015 Asian Cup.

In May 2018, Beitashour was included in Iran's 35-man preliminary squad for the 2018 FIFA World Cup but was not chosen for the final 23.

Style of play 
Beitashour has been praised for his crosses and his ability to get around defenders.

Outside football

Sponsorship 
Beitashour is outfitted by sportswear manufacturer Adidas.

Career statistics

College

Senior

Club 

1.Includes Lamar Hunt U.S. Open Cup and Canadian Championship.
2.Includes CONCACAF Champions League.

Honors
San Jose Earthquakes
Supporters' Shield: 2012

Vancouver Whitecaps
Canadian Championship: 2015

Toronto FC
MLS Cup: 2017
Supporters' Shield: 2017
Canadian Championship: 2016, 2017
Eastern Conference Winners (Playoffs): 2016, 2017

Los Angeles FC
Supporters' Shield: 2019

Individual
MLS All-Star: 2012

See also
 Iranian Americans

References

External links

 
 
 Videos and Highlights of Steven Beitashour
 USMNT or Iran, A player with options – Power 5 Klinsmann's Radar at YouTube
 Inside: Steven Beitashour 4–15–12 at YouTube
 Steven Beitashour High School highlights at YouTube

1987 births
Living people
Soccer players from San Jose, California
Iranian footballers
Iran international footballers
American soccer players
San Diego State Aztecs men's soccer players
San Jose Frogs players
San Jose Earthquakes players
Vancouver Whitecaps FC players
Toronto FC players
Los Angeles FC players
Colorado Rapids players
Colorado Rapids 2 players
USL League Two players
Major League Soccer players
MLS Next Pro players
American people of Iranian-Assyrian descent
Iranian Assyrian people
Leland High School (San Jose, California) alumni
Major League Soccer All-Stars
San Jose Earthquakes draft picks
American people of Iranian descent
2014 FIFA World Cup players
San Diego State University alumni
Association football fullbacks
Iranian people of Assyrian descent
Sportspeople of Iranian descent
Assyrian footballers